Genius Project is project portfolio management software (PPM). The product includes a KPI module, Gantt charting, support for project requests and help desk/trouble tickets as work items, support for scrum, configurable views, meeting management, project output tracking, and the genius live social collaboration platform.

History 

Genius Project is developed by Genius Inside. It was first released in 1997 and is available in English, German, Spanish, and French. It is a project management software that can be used for any type of company. The product has evolved from a simple project management solution to a full suite of enterprise project and portfolio management application, offered in both software as a service and on-premises deployment options built on IBM middleware.

Competition 

 Severa
 Doolphy
 Goodwerp

See also 

 Comparison of project management software
 Project management software

Awards 

 Winner Innovationspreis-IT 2014 in the On-Demand“
 Winner of the Silver and Excellence Award 2014
 Winner of the IBM Lotus Awards: Best Mid-Market Solution 2008
 Innovative Product 2007, Initiative Mittelstand
 Nominated for ERP system of the year 2012, category Services, des Jahres, Potsdam Center for Enterprise Research (CER)

References 

Project management software
1997 software
Projects established in 1997